The Fundació Antoni Tàpies ('Antoni Tàpies Foundation') is a cultural center and museum, located in Carrer d'Aragó, in Barcelona, Catalonia. It is dedicated mainly to the life and works of the painter Antoni Tàpies.

The Fundació was created in 1984 by the artist Antoni Tàpies to promote the study and knowledge of modern and contemporary art. It combines the organisation of temporary exhibitions, symposia, lectures and film seasons with a range of publications to go with the activities and periodic shows of Tàpies' work.

The Fundació owns one of the most complete collections of Tàpies' work, mostly made up of donations by Antoni and Teresa Tàpies.

The building
The Fundació opened in June 1990 in the building of the former Montaner i Simon publishing house, a work of the architect Lluís Domènech i Montaner, restored and refurbished by the architects Roser Amadó and Lluís Domènech Girbau. Constructed between 1880 and 1885, at an early stage of the evolution of Catalan Modernisme style, the building was the first in the Eixample district to integrate industrial typology, combining exposed brick and iron.

Recent Exhibitions
Susan Meiselas. Mediations Until January 14, 2018 
Antoni Tàpies. Objects Until January 14, 2018

Website

Fundació Antoni Tàpies museum, Barcelona

Transport
Barcelona Metro station Passeig de Gràcia (L2, L3, L4)

See also
List of museums in Barcelona

References

External links
 
Visitor Report (in German)

Art museums and galleries in Catalonia
Biographical museums in Spain
Museums in Barcelona
Foundations based in Catalonia
Eixample
Art museums established in 1990
1990 establishments in Spain
Tapies